is a retired Japanese judoka.

He was born in Tsurugi, Ishikawa, and began to train in judo at the age of 5. He entered the Ryotokuji Gakuen after graduating from Tsukuba University.

He is good at Seoinage and Sode tsurikomi goshi. Since 2000, He got a gold medal at the Kodokan Cup, and has been a judoka representing Japan in the Lightweight category.

Kanamaru was placed seventh in the Men's 73 kg class at the 2008 Summer Olympics.

Achievements

References

External links
 
 

Japanese male judoka
1979 births
Sportspeople from Ishikawa Prefecture
Living people
Asian Games medalists in judo
Judoka at the 2002 Asian Games
Asian Games silver medalists for Japan
Medalists at the 2002 Asian Games
Judoka at the 2008 Summer Olympics
Olympic judoka of Japan
20th-century Japanese people
21st-century Japanese people